Ras Mulugeta Yeggazu (Amharic: ሙሉጌታ ይገዙ; killed 27 February 1936) was an Ethiopian government official. He served as Imperial Fitawrari, Commander of the Mahel Sefari (Central Army) of the Ethiopian Army during the Second Italo-Ethiopian War.

Biography
Mulugeta fought as a young warrior in the Battle of Adwa during the First Italo-Ethiopian War.  He served as Minister of Finance during the last years of Emperor Menelik II's reign and then again under Empress Zewditu (1907-1915). From 1916 to 1917, he was Ethiopia's Minister of Foreign Affairs.  While governor of Illubabor, Mulugeta escorted then Ras Tafari (the later Emperor Haile Selassie) on his tour of Europe in 1924. In 1926, he was appointed as Minister of War, and a few years later commanded the loyalist troops to victory at the Battle of Anchem.

During the Second Italo-Ethiopian War, Mulugeta was appointed Imperial Commander of the Vanguard (Fitawrari) to replace the disgraced Birru Wolde Gabriel. Along with his son, Tadessa Mulugeta, he was killed during the retreat of his defeated army from Amba Aradam by Oromos paid by the Italians.

See also
 First Italo-Ethiopian War
 Battle of Adwa
 Gugsa Welle's Rebellion
 Battle of Anchem
Second Italo-Ethiopian War
 Ethiopian Christmas Offensive
 Battle of Amba Aradam

Sources

External links 
  Photo of Ras Mulugeta Yeggazu 1930

1936 deaths
Ethiopian nobility
Finance ministers of Ethiopia
Foreign ministers of Ethiopia
Defence ministers of Ethiopia
Ethiopian military personnel killed in action
Year of birth missing
20th-century Ethiopian politicians